Spitakşen or Spitakshen may refer to:
Ağkənd (disambiguation), several places in Azerbaijan
Spitakashen, Hadrut, also known as Spitakşen, a village in the Khojavend raion of Azerbaijan
Spitakashen, Martuni, Republic of Artsakh
Spitakşen, Shamkir, Azerbaijan